Upwards is the second studio album by British hip hop musician Ty. It was released on Big Dada in 2003. It peaked at number 35 on the UK Independent Albums Chart. The album was nominated for the 2004 Mercury Prize.

Critical reception
Jon Dolan of Spin said, "Ty is most reminiscent of robo-voiced Brit MCs like Roots Manuva, and his turtleneck-rocking look suggests a dude too arty to party, but his mix of neo-soul warmth, skip-rope beats, and clever rhymes smoothes out his raggafied rough edges."

Track listing

Charts

References

External links
 

2003 albums
Ty (rapper) albums
Big Dada albums